Bractechlamys is a genus of molluscs in the family Pectinidae.

Selected species
 Bractechlamys adorabilis (Dijkstra & Roussy, 1994) 
 Bractechlamys corallinoides (d'Orbigny, 1840)
 Bractechlamys evecta (Iredale, 1939)
 Bractechlamys georgei (Dijkstra, 1998)
 Bractechlamys langfordi (Dall, Bartsch & Rehder, 1938)
 Bractechlamys nodulifera (G. B. Sowerby II, 1842)
 Bractechlamys oweni (De Gregorio, 1884)
 Bractechlamys occasussolis (S. K. Hughes, 2023)
 Bractechlamys vexillum (Reeves, 1853)

References

Pectinidae
Bivalve genera